AsiaWorld–Arena (also Hall 1 of AsiaWorld–Expo) is the largest indoor seated performance venue in Hong Kong. It is located next to the Hong Kong International Airport. It plays host to many concerts, sporting events, and other forms of entertainment.

Entertainment

AsiaWorld–Arena has been the busiest indoor venue in Hong Kong since its opening on 21 December 2005; with many local, regional and international artists have performed here spanning a wide range of musical genres.

Other events
The Arena has also played host to the 10th Anniversary Celebration Gala of Phoenix Satellite Television and the Miss Chinese Cosmos Pageant, as well as sports competitions like the K-1 World Grand Prix 2007 and the 2008 Hong Kong IDSF Asian Pacific DanceSport Championships.
 
It played host to Walking with Dinosaurs – The Arena Spectacular from 22 December 2010 to 2 January 2011.

On 18 March 2015, the arena hosted One Direction on their On the Road Again Tour. This concert would ultimately be the final performance with Zayn Malik as a member before his departure from the group six days later. 

Miss International Organization confirms that Hong Kong will be the host country of Miss International 2017.

Ariana Grande performed at the venue on 21 September 2017 part of the final show of the Dangerous Woman Tour.

References

External links

AsiaWorld Expo webpage

Indoor arenas in Hong Kong
Music venues in Hong Kong